The  Tennessee Titans season was the franchise's 42nd season in the National Football League (NFL), the 52nd overall and the 15th in the state of Tennessee. It also marked the first season under head coach Mike Munchak, replacing longtime head coach Jeff Fisher, who resigned on January 27 after 17 seasons. The team improved on their 6–10 record from 2010 and finished tied with the Cincinnati Bengals for the last playoff spot, but lost the tiebreaker due to their 24–17 loss to the Bengals in Week 9, missing the playoffs for a third consecutive season.

Offseason

2011 draft class

Coaching staff

Final roster

Preseason

Schedule

The Titans' preseason schedule was announced on April 12, 2011.

Regular season

Schedule

Game summaries

Week 1: at Jacksonville Jaguars

Week 2: vs. Baltimore Ravens

Week 3: vs. Denver Broncos

Week 4: at Cleveland Browns

Week 5: at Pittsburgh Steelers

Coming off their road win over the Browns, the Titans flew to Heinz Field for a Week 5 intraconference duel with the Pittsburgh Steelers.  Tennessee threw the game's opening punch in the first quarter with a 29-yard field goal from kicker Rob Bironas, but the Steelers answered with quarterback Ben Roethlisberger completing an 8-yard touchdown pass to tight end Heath Miller.  Pittsburgh added onto their lead in the second with Roethlisberger completing a 7-yard touchdown pass to wide receiver Hines Ward and a 1-yard touchdown pass to fullback David Johnson.

The Steelers continued their dominating performance in the third quarter with Roethlisberger completing a 5-yard touchdown pass to Ward.  The Titans would respond with a 1-yard touchdown run from running back Chris Johnson, yet Pittsburgh came right back in the fourth quarter with kicker Shaun Suisham getting a 19-yard field goal.  Tennessee tried to rally as quarterback Matt Hasselbeck found wide receiver Damian Williams on a 19-yard touchdown pass, but the Steelers closed out the game with Roethlisberger completing a 40-yard touchdown pass to wide receiver Mike Wallace.

With the loss, the Titans fell to 3–2.

Week 7: vs. Houston Texans

Week 8: vs. Indianapolis Colts

Week 9: vs. Cincinnati Bengals

Week 10: at Carolina Panthers

Week 11: at Atlanta Falcons

Week 12: vs. Tampa Bay Buccaneers

Week 13: at Buffalo Bills

Week 14: vs. New Orleans Saints

Week 15: at Indianapolis Colts

Week 16: vs. Jacksonville Jaguars

With the win the Titans improved to 8–7. In order to secure a playoff spot the Tennessee Titans need a win at Houston in Week 17, Plus a Bengals loss, also a Broncos and Raiders win as well. If either Cincinnati wins against Baltimore or Denver loses against Kansas City, the Titans will be eliminated from postseason contention.

Week 17: at Houston Texans

With the win, the Titans finished the season 9–7 and would secure their first winning season since 2008. But were eliminated from postseason contention due to the Denver Broncos losing against the Kansas City Chiefs 7–3

Standings

References

Tennessee
Tennessee Titans seasons
Titans